Pulsação is the first compilation album by the Portuguese pop singer Susana Félix. It was released on November 19, 2007. It includes "Mais Olhos (Que Barriga)" and "Um Lugar Enacantado", the two first singles from Felix's debut album Um Pouco mais. The rest of the songs are taken from the other two albums, Rosa e Vermelho and Índigo.

All the songs are written by Susana Félix. The album was produced by Susana Félix and Renato Jr., as were the previous albums Um Pouco Mais, Rosa e Vermelho and Índigo.

Two new songs, "(Bem) Na minha mão" and "Amanhecer (Sempre Mais Uma Vez)", were written and recorded for this album and released as singles.

Reception

Critical response
Reviews for Pulsação were generally favourable; it holds a score of 72/100 in AlbumScores based on seven professional reviews.

Edusurfa and ABCmusic gave a rating of 4 out of 5, saying that Pulsaçãois one of the best Portuguese compilations ever (ABCmusic gave a rating of 7 out of 10 for the second version). Nova Guarda and Reconquista gave the album a rating of 3 out of 5 stars.

DiscoDigital.com gave a positive review of the album and said, "Susana Félix is a curious case in the national pop. Usually surrounded by highly respectable names, has not reached the right ears to be respected as it deserves. Susana Felix had everything to have a career as a one hit wonder with "Mais Olhos (Que Barriga)" (1999) and she had several episodes as previous participation in a project of Mafalda Veiga and various collaborations. Now with 32 years and after three albums, which has to debug the pop song but not always as regularly as desired in all subjects, 'Pulsação' recalls some of his best moments while the relaxed versions. Surrounded by names like Rafael and Pedro Nuno Gonçalves, Susana Felix hits on this record that that is your state of grace and at the same time, consolidating the status of singer respectful. In this respect, 'Pulsação' may finally get the right people that will provide due recognition.
For example, "(Bem) Na Minha Mão", one of two unpublished herein, and signed by herself reveals that it is and that should be your special place: a safe song, well sung and arranged with exquisite. Neither more nor less, is to pop in all its splendor."

Qmusika gave a rating of 3.5 out of 5.

Commercial
The album debuted at number one on the Portuguese Album Chart.

Track listing
The following track list has twelve songs, most of them taken from the previous three albums, plus two new songs: "(Bem) Na Minha mão" and "Amanhecer (Sempre Mais Uma Vez)".

Personnel
Information retrieved from Félix's official blog.
Renato Junior – keyboards
Nuno Rafael – guitar
Alexandre Frazão – drums
Maximo Cavali – violi
Jorge Teixeira – Portuguese guitar
Vasco Brôco – violin
Tózé Miranda – violin
Jeremy Lake – violoncel
João Cabrita – saxophone
João Marques – fliscorne
Jorge Ribeiro – trombone

Charts

Release history

References

External links
Susana Félix official site 

2007 compilation albums
Susana Félix albums